Mexichromis festiva is a species of sea slug, a dorid nudibranch, a shell-less marine gastropod mollusc in the family Chromodorididae.

Distribution 
This species was described from Port Jackson, Australia.

Description
Mexichromis festiva is a white chromodorid nudibranch with raised pink spots on the mantle. The edge of the mantle has a broken yellow line superimposed on an opaque white margin. The gill rachis is pink and the gill leaves are white. The outer half of the rhinophores is pink.

References

Chromodorididae
Gastropods described in 1864